Thomas Bonner Rees was an English Christian evangelist. He founded the Hildenborough evangelistic conference center in 1945. His widow Jean wrote a biography "His Name was Tom".

References
Douglas, J.D. and Comfort, Philip W., Who's Who in Christian History. Tyndale House 1992.

Year of birth missing
Year of death missing
English Christian religious leaders
Evangelists